The  Frank J. Brick House is a house located at 300 N. Fillmore St. in Jerome, Idaho.  It was built by stonemason H.T. Pugh in 1917. The lava rock house is topped by a gable roof with four purlins and a dormer on the south side. The house was one of the first lava rock residences constructed in Jerome.

The house was listed on the National Register of Historic Places on September 8, 1993.

See also

 List of National Historic Landmarks in Idaho
 National Register of Historic Places listings in Jerome County, Idaho

References

1917 establishments in Idaho
Houses completed in 1917
Houses in Jerome County, Idaho
Houses on the National Register of Historic Places in Idaho
National Register of Historic Places in Jerome County, Idaho
Lava rock buildings and structures